HMS Nonsuch was a 50-gun fourth rate ship of the line of the Royal Navy, launched at Deptford in 1696.

Nonsuch was converted into a hulk in 1740, and she continued to serve in this capacity until 1745, when she was broken up.

Notes

References

Lavery, Brian (2003) The Ship of the Line - Volume 1: The development of the battlefleet 1650-1850. Conway Maritime Press. .

Ships of the line of the Royal Navy
1690s ships